The men's triple jump event at the 2022 African Championships in Athletics was held on 11 June in Port Louis, Mauritius.

Results

References

2022 African Championships in Athletics
Triple jump at the African Championships in Athletics